Wyncote is a census-designated place (CDP) in Cheltenham Township, Montgomery County, Pennsylvania. It borders the northwestern and northeastern section of Philadelphia. Wyncote is located 11 miles from Center City Philadelphia at the southeasternmost tip of Montgomery County. The Jenkintown-Wyncote SEPTA station is the fifth busiest regional rail station in the SEPTA system.

Wyncote is bordered by the Cheltenham neighborhoods of Glenside, Elkins Park, La Mott, and Cedarbrook; the Philadelphia neighborhoods of West Oak Lane and Cedarbrook, as well as the borough of Jenkintown and Abington Township.

Geography
Wyncote is located at  (40.092777, −75.142559).

Demographics

As of the census of 2010, there were 3,044 people, 1,057 households, and 713 families residing in the CDP. The population density was 3,732.5 people per square mile (1,434.2/km2). There were 1,069 housing units at an average density of 1,309.9/sq mi (503.3/km2). The racial makeup of the CDP was 79.7% White, 13.6% African American, 0.03% Native American, 3.9% Asian, 0.10% Pacific Islander, 0.26% from other races, and 0.53% from two or more races. Hispanic or Latino of any race were 0.79% of the population.

There were 1,057 households, out of which 30.4% had children under the age of 18 living with them, 59.0% were married couples living together, 7.1% had a female householder with no husband present, and 32.5% were non-families. 29.5% of all households were made up of individuals, and 21.0% had someone living alone who was 65 years of age or older. The average household size was 2.48 and the average family size was 3.08.

In the CDP, the population was spread out, with 20.3% under the age of 18, 4.8% from 18 to 24, 19.5% from 25 to 44, 23.5% from 45 to 64, and 32.0% who were 65 years of age or older. The median age was 49 years. For every 100 females, there were 75.7 males. For every 100 females age 18 and over, there were 69.9 males.

The median income for a household in the CDP was $77,043, and the median income for a family was $91,217. Males had a median income of $60,592 versus $41,458 for females. The per capita income for the CDP was $32,340. None of the families and 2.2% of the population were living below the poverty line, including no under eighteens and 4.9% of those over 64.

Notable people
 Eddie Applegate, actor
 Chris Conlin, All-American football player at Penn State
 Cyrus Hermann Kotzschmar Curtis, longtime publisher of The Saturday Evening Post and Ladies' Home Journal, as well as other magazines and newspapers
 Marian Filar (1917–2012), Polish-born American-based concert pianist and virtuoso
 Reggie Jackson, retired Hall of Fame baseball player; born and lived in Wyncote through high school
 George Horace Lorimer, author and longtime editor of the Saturday Evening Post
 Bernie Lowe, founder of Cameo Records.
 John Charles Martin, newspaper publisher
 Yonatan Netanyahu (1946–1976), Israeli soldier and Entebbe rescue commander; brother of Benjamin Netanyahu; attended Cheltenham High School
 Ezra Pound, poet; grew up in Wyncote

Wyncote Historic District

Wyncote features the Wyncote Historic District which is a US Historic district, added in October, 1986. It was made a historic district for its Architecture, Community Planning, and Development. The district covers over 100 acres, and 178 contributing buildings.

The Wyncote Historic District has a number of restored Victorian-era homes. The All Hallows Church (constructed 1896–1897) was designed by a firm founded by Philadelphia architect Frank Furness (Furness, Evans and Company). Wyncote also has a number of classical Philadelphia stone colonial revival homes; notable among them is Beechwood, designed in the school of Brognard Okie, the architect responsible for the reconstruction of Pennsbury Manor on the upper Delaware River, and Appleford in Villanova, Pennsylvania.

Wyncote Historic District

Transportation

Public transit

Wyncote is served by SEPTA, through regional rail at the Jenkintown–Wyncote station. The building is a historic structure, dating back to its original use with the North Pennsylvania Railroad. Trains pass through regularly going south to Philadelphia or north to Bucks County. Wyncote is a 30-minute train ride from downtown Philadelphia. Wyncote is also served by SEPTA buses, in particular the 77 route, which connects Chestnut Hill to Mayfair, Philadelphia.

Roads
Wyncote is in a convenient location driving-wise; about a 25-minute drive to downtown Philadelphia, 2 hours from New York City, 2 hours to the Pocono Mountains, and 1.5 hours to the Jersey Shore, just to name a few accessible locations. The following are the most heavily traveled roads in Wyncote:

 provides a thruway for Wyncote, Cheltenham Township, and Montgomery County as a whole.
 has its beginnings with the intersection of PA 611, and continues up through Wyncote. It provides a key route to the Pennsylvania Turnpike.
 also known as Limekiln Pike, connects PA 309 and PA 73 in Wyncote.

Climate
Wyncote has the climate of a typical Mid-Atlantic town. Summers are hot with highs averaging in the high 80s (°F), with lows being anywhere from the high 60s to the low 80s. Summers also see some days climb into the 90s, and even some that top the 100-degree mark. Spring and Fall are pleasant, with highs averaging in the mid 60s, and lows in the mid 40s. Winters are cold, with highs averaging around 40, and lows averaging in the high teens. The middle of winter occasionally sees a few days where highs do not rise above the teens, and lows fall into the single digits. The following is a chart of the average temperatures in Wyncote

Points of interest 

 Curtis Arboretum
 Thomas Williams Park

Schools
Ancillae Assumpta Academy
Wyncote Elementary School
Cedarbrook Middle School
Cheltenham High School
Wyncote Academy
Bishop McDevitt High School (Wyncote, Pennsylvania)
Reconstructionist Rabbinical College, the only seminary affiliated with Reconstructionist Judaism
Arcadia University

References

External links

Locale 

Census-designated places in Montgomery County, Pennsylvania
Cheltenham Township, Pennsylvania